Găujani is a commune located in Giurgiu County, Muntenia, Romania. It is composed of three villages: Cetățuia, Găujani, and Pietrișu.

The commune is located in the southwestern extremity of the county, on the left bank of the Danube. It lies on the border with Teleorman County and on the border with the Ruse Province of Bulgaria. Găujani is crossed by the  national road, which connects the county seat, Giurgiu,  to the northeast, to Zimnicea,  to the west.

Natives
 Mariana Nicolesco (1948–2022), operatic soprano

References

Communes in Giurgiu County
Localities in Muntenia
Populated places on the Danube